A visual narrative (also visual storytelling) is a story told primarily through the use of visual media. The story may be told using still photography, illustration, or video, and can be enhanced with graphics, music, voice and other audio.

Overview
The term "visual narrative" has been used to describe several genres of visual storytelling, from news and information (photojournalism, the photo essay, the documentary film) to entertainment (art, movies, television, comic books, the graphic novel). In short, any kind of a story, told visually, is a visual narrative. 

The visual narrative has also been of interest to the academic community as scholars, thinkers and educators have sought to understand the impact and power of image and narrative in individuals and societies. The corresponding discipline is called visual narratology.

Visual narrative might include:
stories from a point of view
images, still or moving
glimpses on a specific subject
an appeal for transformation in attitudes and behaviors

See also
 Multiliteracy
 Sequential art
 Visual literacy

References 

Visual arts
Narrative forms